Ignatius Paul Pinto (18 May 1925 – 8 February 2023) was an Indian Roman Catholic prelate. He was bishop of Shimoga from 1988 to 1998 and archbishop of Bangalore from 1998 to 2004.

References

1925 births
2023 deaths
20th-century Roman Catholic bishops in India
21st-century Roman Catholic archbishops in India
Roman Catholic archbishops of Bangalore